Khaled Mohammed Mohammed Saleh (born 7 June 2000) is a Qatari footballer who plays as a midfielder for Al Ahli on loan from Al-Duhail .

Club career
Mohammed made his professional debut for Al-Duhail in the Qatari Stars Cup on 11 October 2018, coming on as a substitute in the 68th minute for Abdelrahman Ahmad Nuzha in the 1–1 draw against fellow Qatar Stars League team Al-Gharafa.

International career
On 3 January 2019, following an injury to Ahmed Moein, Mohammed was included in Qatar's squad for the 2019 AFC Asian Cup in the United Arab Emirates, becoming the youngest player of the tournament.

Honours

International
Qatar
AFC Asian Cup: 2019

References

External links
 
 
 

2000 births
Living people
People from Doha
Qatari footballers
Qatari expatriate footballers
Qatar youth international footballers
Association football midfielders
El Jaish SC players
Al-Duhail SC players
Cultural Leonesa footballers
Qatar SC players
Al Ahli SC (Doha) players
2019 AFC Asian Cup players
Qatar Stars League players
AFC Asian Cup-winning players
Expatriate footballers in England
Expatriate footballers in Spain
Qatari expatriate sportspeople in England
Qatari expatriate sportspeople in Spain
Qatar under-20 international footballers